Velika Brda is a small village north of Hruševje in the Municipality of Postojna in the Inner Carniola region of Slovenia.

References

External links

Velika Brda on Geopedia

Populated places in the Municipality of Postojna